Mike Nemes (born February 20, 1954) is an American politician who serves in the Kentucky State Senate representing the 38th Senate district since January 28, 2020. He previously served in the Kentucky House of Representatives representing the 38th House district from January 2011 to January 8, 2013.

References

1954 births
Living people
Politicians from Louisville, Kentucky
Kentucky Republicans
21st-century American politicians